Filodrillia delicatula is a species of sea snail, a marine gastropod mollusk in the family Borsoniidae.

Description

Distribution
This marine species is endemic to Australia and occurs off New South Wales.

References

 Laseron, C. 1954. Revision of the New South Wales Turridae (Mollusca). Australian Zoological Handbook. Sydney : Royal Zoological Society of New South Wales 1-56, pls 1-12.

delicatula
Gastropods of Australia
Gastropods described in 1954